Campo La Cruz is a village and rural municipality in Salta Province in northwestern Argentina. It had 136 residents at the 2001 census.

References

Populated places in Salta Province